Montigny-le-Tilleul is a municipality of Wallonia located in the province of Hainaut, Belgium. 

On January 1, 2006, Montigny-le-Tilleul had a total population of 10,205. The total area is 15.10 km² which gives a population density of 676 inhabitants per km².

The municipality consists of the sections of Landelies and Montigny-le-Tilleul.

Notable inhabitants
 Jules Hiernaux, politician (1881-1944)

Sights
 Village of Landelies, at the Haute-Sambre: picturesque port, lock and weir. Nice place for walking and biking. Railway station.

References

External links
 

Municipalities of Hainaut (province)